The Turkish Basketball All-Star Game is an annual basketball event in Turkey, organised by the BSL which was formerly known as TBL. The All-Star Game includes a match between a selection of the domestic versus foreign players of the BSL, a slam-dunk and a three-point contest. In its first three editions (2004, 2005, 2006) it was known as the TBL All-Star Game, from 2007 until 2014 as the Beko All-Star Game and after 2014 as the BSL All-Star Game. The rosters are being chosen by an online voting. The event was first played in the 2003–04 season. The 2020 event was the 17th edition of the Turkish All-Star Game.

List of games
Bold: Team that won the game.

Three-Point Shoot Contest

Slam-Dunk Contest

Players with most appearances

References

 
All-star games
Basketball all-star games
Basketball in Turkey